Section, Sectioning or Sectioned may refer to:

Arts, entertainment and media
 Section (music),  a complete, but not independent, musical idea
 Section (typography), a subdivision, especially of a chapter, in books and documents
 Section sign (§),  typographical characters 
 Section (bookbinding), a group of sheets, folded in the middle, bound into the binding together
 The Section (band), a 1970s American instrumental rock band
 The Outpost (1995 film), also known as The Section
 The Prisoner (2023 film), also known as Prisoners
 Section, an instrumental group within an orchestra
 "Section", a song by 2 Chainz from the 2016 album ColleGrove
 "Sectioning", a Peep Show episode
 David "Section" Mason, a fictional character in Call of Duty: Black Ops II

Organisations
 Section (Alpine club)
 Section (military unit)
 Section (Scouting)

Science, technology and mathematics

Science 
 Section (archaeology), a view in part of the archaeological sequence showing it in the vertical plane
 Section (biology), a taxonomic rank that is applied differently between botany and zoology
 Section (botany)
 Histological section, a thin slice of tissue used for microscopic examination, achieved by sectioning

Mathematics 
 Section (category theory), a right inverse of some morphism
 Section (fiber bundle), in topology
 Part of a sheaf (mathematics)
 Section (group theory), a quotient object of a subobject

Other uses in science and technology
 , an HTML5 markup
 Sectioning (car), a customization of hot rod cars

Surveying 
 Section (United States land surveying), an area nominally one square mile 
 Section, an area of one square mile in Dominion Land Survey, Western Canada
 Section, part of the Alberta Township System

Other uses 
 Section, Alabama, a town in the United States
 Section (rail transport), a portion of railway line or a portion of a train
 Sectioning, involuntary commitment for severe mental illness

See also

 Cross section (disambiguation)
 Division (disambiguation)
 Part (disambiguation)
 Sectional (disambiguation)
 Sector (disambiguation)
 Segment (disambiguation)
 Caesarean section, or C-section, the use of surgery to deliver babies